Wheelock & Sandbach railway station was built by the North Staffordshire Railway (NSR) to serve the Cheshire village of Wheelock. Originally conceived as a line between Stoke-upon-Trent and Liverpool (an idea abandoned as part of an agreement with the Grand Junction Railway in 1845), the short line from Lawton Junction to Ettiley Heath was opened as a goods traffic only line in 1852.

The passenger service was not large and there were only three trains each way per day.  Extra services were provided on Thursday (market day in Sandbach) and Saturday, but there was no Sunday service. By August 1927, the passenger service had been reduced to services only Thursday and Saturday and in June 1930, the London, Midland and Scottish Railway decided to withdraw the passenger service from 28 July 1930.

The station buildings still survive in use as a tyre-fitting business and the trackbed forms part of National Cycle Network route 5.

References
Notes

Sources

Disused railway stations in Cheshire
Railway stations in Great Britain closed in 1930
Railway stations in Great Britain opened in 1893
Former North Staffordshire Railway stations